The Aquatrain (or AquaTrain) was an unpowered unmanned sea-going rail barge operated by Canadian National Railway (CN) between Prince Rupert, British Columbia, Canada, and the Alaska Railroad in Whittier, Alaska, United States. It is the largest such barge in the world, containing 8 sidings and using a tug for power and control. The length of loadable train, some 50 cars, would, if the cars were placed end to end, rise up twice as tall as the Chicago Willis Tower. The ferry service started operations in 1962, and had a 3-day voyage between Whittier and Prince Rupert, usually operating once a week, year-round. Since 1993, the Aquatrain's maritime tugboats and tug crews were provided by Foss Maritime. Foss utilized two  tugboats Justine Foss and Barbara Foss.

Service ended in April 2021.

References

External links
 CN Rail, CN Aquatrain: Fastest Rail Ferry Service to Alaska
 oil-electric, Boxcars Go to Sea - CN "AquaTrain", 20 March 2008
 Flickr, CN AquaTrain barge at Fairview, Prince Rupert slip, where rail cars are delivered to & received from the Alaska Railroad - 19 October 2014, Jim Throne

Train ferries
Canadian National Railway
Transport in Prince Rupert, British Columbia
1963 establishments in British Columbia
1963 establishments in Alaska
1982 ships